Giuseppe Spinelli (1 February 1694 – 12 April 1763) was an Italian cardinal. He was Prefect of the Congregation for the Propagation of the Faith

Biography 
A native of Naples, he was the son of Giambattista Spinelli, marquis of Fuscaldo, prince of Sant'Arcangelo and duke of Caivano. His mother was Maria Imperiali. He was the grand-nephew of Cardinal Lorenzo Imperiali, cousin of Cardinal Cosimo Imperiali, and uncle of Cardinal Ferdinando Spinelli.

At the age of thirteen, he was sent to Rome to live with his maternal uncle, Cardinal Giuseppe Renato Imperiali, while attending the seminary. In 1717, he was awarded a doctorate in civil and canon law from La Sapienza University. 

He was named privy chamberlain of Pope Clement XI, and ordained a priest in 1724. The following year he was appointed papal nuncio to Flanders and consecrated titular archbishop of Corinthus by Cardinal d'Alsace. He was archbishop of Naples from 1734 until 1754. In this capacity, he conducted a search for the relics of Agrippinus, an early bishop of the city. He found a marble vase with the following words written: "Indeterminate relics that are believed to be the body of Saint Agrippinus." He also summoned Stefano Pozzi to decorate the cathedral at Naples.

His clandestine attempt to introduce the Inquisition to Naples in 1746, resulted in a violent popular uprising, whereupon Charles III forced him to renounce his see and leave the capital. He did so with the greatest of reluctance, attempting first to remedy the situation from Rome, but finally resigned the Archbishopric in early 1754.

In 1756, he became prefect of the Congregation for the Evangelization of Peoples. He later became Bishop of Palestrina in 1753, Bishop of Porto e Santa Rufina in 1759, and Bishop of Ostia in 1761. He belonged to the conservative zelanti faction in the College of Cardinals. He became Dean of the Sacred College in June 1761. He was also Cardinal protector of the Scottish nation from 1753 until his death.

Spinelli died at Rome in 1763.

References

External links
Catholic Hierarchy 
Biography

1694 births
1763 deaths
17th-century Neapolitan people
Archbishops of Naples
18th-century Italian cardinals
Deans of the College of Cardinals
Cardinal-bishops of Ostia
Cardinal-bishops of Palestrina
Cardinal-bishops of Porto
18th-century Italian Roman Catholic archbishops
Members of the Congregation for the Propagation of the Faith
Latin archbishops of Corinth
18th-century Neapolitan people